Saraysino (Harayśa) is a rural locality (a village) in Saraysinsky Selsoviet, Sterlibashevsky District, Bashkortostan, Russia. The population was 283 as of 2010. There are 7 streets.

Geography 
Saraysino is located 43 km southeast of Sterlibashevo (the district's administrative centre) by road. Bulyak is the nearest rural locality.

References 

Rural localities in Sterlibashevsky District